Tertiary Institutes Allied Staff Assoc Inc v Tahana [1998] 1 NZLR 41 is a cited case in New Zealand regarding the legal defence of judicial proceedings regarding defamation claims in tort.

Background
Unhappy with the performance of the Chief Executive Mr Tahana, of the Waiariki polytech, the Tertiary Institutes Allied Staff Association lodged a complaint with the polytech's council.

As a result of this complaint, Tahana sued the association for defamation. They in turn defended the claim on the grounds of being absolutely privileged under section 14 of the Defamation Act, which covers matters raised judicially, such as a court proceedings.

Held
The court held that the Polytech's tribunal did not meet the threshold of being "judicial", and the associations defence failed.

References

Court of Appeal of New Zealand cases
New Zealand tort case law
1998 in New Zealand law
1998 in case law